Eero Reino Lehtonen (21 April 1898 – 9 November 1959) was a Finnish athlete. He competed at the 1920 Olympics in the pentathlon, long jump and decathlon and at the 1924 Olympics in the pentathlon and 4 × 400 m relay. He won the pentathlon at both Games, but performed poorly in other events. He retired after learning that pentathlon was excluded from the 1928 Olympics.

In 1920 Lehtonen won the national titles in the pentathlon and long jump, setting a new national long jump record at 7.02 m. At the 1920 Olympics he tried decathlon, but gave up after five events. He semi-retired after the Olympics, but returned in 1922, again winning the national long jump and pentathlon titles. At the 1924 Olympic pentathlon competition Robert LeGendre set a world record in the long jump, but Lehtonen did better on average and won the gold medal.

In 1984, a bronze statue of Lehtonen was installed at the sports park in Mikkeli, his home town.

References

1898 births
1959 deaths
People from Mikkeli
People from Mikkeli Province (Grand Duchy of Finland)
Finnish pentathletes
Finnish decathletes
Olympic athletes of Finland
Olympic gold medalists for Finland
Athletes (track and field) at the 1920 Summer Olympics
Athletes (track and field) at the 1924 Summer Olympics
Medalists at the 1924 Summer Olympics
Medalists at the 1920 Summer Olympics
Olympic gold medalists in athletics (track and field)
Olympic decathletes
Sportspeople from South Savo